Airborne is the sixth studio album by Curved Air and was recorded in 1976. Like their last few releases, it was not a significant commercial success. After a follow-up non-album single, "Baby Please Don't Go" b/w "Broken Lady", the group disbanded. Drummer Stewart Copeland went on to form The Police, while violinist Darryl Way and lead singer Sonja Kristina both pursued solo careers. Bassist Tony Reeves and guitarist Mick Jacques both later became members of the semiprofessional band Big Chief.

The Police covered "Kids to Blame" in early performances, using a stripped-down punk arrangement of the song. Stewart Copeland also reused a guitar riff from "Desiree" in his solo single as Klark Kent, "Don't Care".

Background and recording
The album sessions marked the debut of Stewart Copeland as a songwriter. Around the release of Midnight Wire, he was informed about publishing royalties for songwriters, and responded by churning out compositions until the band accepted a few of his contributions.

Producer Dennis McKay quit the project midway through recording, leaving the remaining four tracks to be produced by Curved Air themselves.

Reception

Allmusic described Airborne as an overlooked record and "a strong summation of all that made the group so important in the first place." While appraising the album as a whole as weaker than their first three, claiming it veers towards generic 1970s rock, they regarded "Desiree" and "Heaven (Never Seemed So Far Away)" as equal to anything on the band's strongest releases.

Track listing
Music and lyrics credits per original issue on BTM records.

Personnel
Curved Air
 Sonja Kristina – vocals
 Darryl Way – violin, keyboards
 Tony Reeves – bass, keyboards, double bass on "Broken Lady"
 Stewart Copeland – drums "heavy artillerie"
 Mick Jacques – guitars

Guest musicians
 Robin Lumley – piano on "Broken Lady"
 Alan Skidmore – saxophone on "Hot & Bothered"
 Henry Lowther – trumpet on "Hot & Bothered"
 Frank Ricotti – congas
 Jack Emblow – accordion on "Broken Lady"
 Bob Sargeant – organ on "Desiree" and "Kids to Blame"

Additional credits
 Tracks 3–5, 7, and 8 produced by Dennis McKay
 Tracks 1, 2, 6, and 9 produced by Curved Air
 Track 10 produced by Tony Reeves
Nick Bradford - engineer

References

Curved Air albums
1976 albums
Albums recorded at Trident Studios